The Brazilian Intelligence Agency (ABIN) is the main intelligence agency in Brazil.  ABIN's mission is to ensure that the Federal Executive has access to knowledge related to the security of the State and society, such as those involving foreign defense, foreign relations, internal security, socioeconomic development and scientific-technological development. A successor organization to the Serviço Nacional de Informações (SNI), it formed during the government of Humberto de Alencar Castelo Branco in the mid-1960s.

In an attempt to bring military intelligence agencies under the control of the civilian-led government as part of the process of democratization that began in Brazil in 1985, President Fernando Collor de Mello replaced the SNI with the short-lived (1990–94) Secretaria de Assuntos Estratégicos (SAE) or Strategic Affairs Secretariat. However, despite the dismissal of 144 SNI officers, the agency continued to be dominated by the military and effective oversight and control of the country's intelligence activities eluded the civilian government.

Current agency

In 1995 President Fernando Henrique Cardoso placed a civilian at the head of the SAE and subsequently created ABIN. Like many other Latin American nations, Brazil faces the challenge of having to overcome a long history of involvement by the military and their related intelligence arms in domestic politics. Early on, ABIN was tainted by a wiretapping and influence peddling scandal that led to the agency being placed under the direct control of the President and the Institutional Security Cabinet rather than being responsible to the national Congress. This had once again undermined the attempt to reduce the influence of the military on Brazilian intelligence agencies and their practises.

However, successive governments have taken a number of steps to reduce the influence of the armed forces and related intelligence agencies in domestic politics. The relationships between these groups and government in Brazil, so closely intertwined for decades, is evolving. The focus of intelligence agencies appears to be moving slowly from managing internal dissent to focusing on external threats and support of the nation's democracy.

Wiretapping suspensions
On 1 September 2008, President Luiz Inácio Lula da Silva suspended the leadership of the organization, including its director Paulo Lacerda, and ordered an investigation into allegations that appeared in Veja magazine of phone tapping of senior figures including the heads of both the Senate and the Supreme Court.

Current functions
ABIN's main function is to investigate real and potential threats to the Brazilian society and government and defend the democratic rule of law, the Brazilian sovereignty and the effectiveness of the public power.

Motto
The agency's motto is "Intelligence for the defense of society, of the democratic rule of Law and of national interests".

See also

 Brazilian Federal Police
 National Public Security Force
 Military of Brazil
 Ministry of Defence of Brazil

Notes and references

External links
 ABIN Official site
  ABIN Official site

Brazilian intelligence agencies